From 2 to 7 of May, 2014 in Volgograd were held the First Open Youth European Delphic Games were held under the patronage of UNESCO.

721 young artists from 26 countries took part in 17 nominations of the contest and festival program of the Games.

The organizers, guests, participants got the greetings of the President of Russia Vladimir Putin, the President of the Parliamentary Assembly of the Council of Europe Anne Brasseur, on behalf of the President of the European Commission Jose Manuel Barroso and the Council of Europe.

References

External links
 The official site

See also 
 International Delphic Committee
 Delphic Games of the modern era

Music festivals staged internationally
Cultural festivals in Russia
Theatre festivals in Russia
Competitions
Arts organizations based in Russia